Roman County is one of the historic counties of Moldavia, Romania. The county seat was Roman.

In 1938, the county was disestablished and incorporated into the newly formed Ținutul Prut, but it was re-established in 1940 after the fall of Carol II's regime - only to be abolished 10 years later by the Communist regime.

Geography
Roman County covered 1,880 km2 and was located in the central-north-eastern part of Greater Romania in the center of Moldavia. Currently, the territory that comprised Roman County is now mostly included in the Neamț County, with some parts in the Iași. Bacău, and Vaslui counties. In the interwar period, the county neighbored Baia County to the north, Iași and Vaslui counties to the east, Tutova County to the southeast, Bacău County to the south, and Neamț County to the west.

Administrative organization

Administratively, in 1930, Roman County was divided into two districts (plăși):

Plasa Miron Costin
Plasa Roman Vodă

Later, Plasa Miron Costin was divided into two districts:
Plasa I.G. Duca
Plasa Moldova

Population 
According to the census data of 1930, the county numbered 151,550 inhabitants, ethnically 90.7% Romanians, 4.7% Jews, 2.3% Romanies, 1.4% Hungarians, as well as other minorities. From a religious point of view, the population consisted of 73.2% Eastern Orthodox, 21.4% Roman Catholic, 4.9% Jewish, as well as other minorities.

Urban population 
The urban population consisted of 71.9% Romanians, 20.6% Jews, 2.1% Romanies, 1.4% Germans, 1.3% Hungarians, as well as other minorities. From a religious point of view, the urban population consisted of 73.8% Eastern Orthodox, 20.9% Jewish, 3.7% Roman Catholic, as well as other minorities.

References

External links

  Roman County on memoria.ro

Former counties of Romania
1950 disestablishments in Romania
1925 establishments in Romania
States and territories disestablished in 1950
States and territories established in 1925
1938 disestablishments in Romania
1940 establishments in Romania
States and territories disestablished in 1938
States and territories established in 1940